The Good News Study Bible is an edition of the Good News Bible with study Bible notes and articles.

Versions
Study Bible versions of the Good News Bible / Today's English Version (GNB/TEV) include:

American Bible Society
Good News Study Bible with Deuterocanonicals / Apocrypha Today's English Version.  Published by the American Bible Society, this uses the 1992 second edition of the GNB /TEV (with American spelling). 1747 pages. The study notes were translated from the Spanish Version Popular Study Bible notes by Eugene A. Nida and edited by Erroll F. Rhodes, Ph.D. Notes are arranged in a section underneath the Biblical text, in similar style to the NIV Study Bible.  Imprimatur is for the Biblical text only, not the notes. 3 Maccabees and Psalm 151 are not included in this Bible.

The Bible Societies
Good News Study Bible. Published in 1997 by The Bible Societies / HarperCollins, this uses the second edition of the GNB/TEV (with British spelling). General Editor The Reverend Professor Paul Ellingworth, 2039 pages. Biblical text is in a single column with the study notes in another column to the right. Section introductions are interspersed throughout the Biblical text, these being differentiated from it by a blue background.

Comparisons
Neither of these editions includes Annie Vallotton's line drawing art.  The study notes in both editions attempt to explain the text and give additional information without introducing doctrinal bias.

Although substantial works by major organisations in the field of Bible publishing, these Bibles came out in a market that had been dominated by the NIV Study Bible for some years and did not gain significant market share.

References 

Study Bibles
Bible translations into English